Upside Down is a 1919 American silent comedy film directed by Lawrence C. Windom and starring Taylor Holmes, Anna Lehr and Roy Applegate.

Cast
 Taylor Holmes as Archibald Pim  
 Anna Lehr as Juliet Pim  
 Roy Applegate as James Wortley Tammers  
 Ruby Hoffman as Mrs. Tammers  
 Harry Lee as Swami

References

Bibliography
 Goble, Alan. The Complete Index to Literary Sources in Film. Walter de Gruyter, 1999.

External links
 

1919 films
1919 comedy films
1910s English-language films
American silent feature films
Silent American comedy films
American black-and-white films
Films directed by Lawrence C. Windom
1910s American films